Nick Sirota (born January 28, 1984) is an American professional ice hockey Right Winger who is currently playing with the Kalamazoo Wings of the ECHL.

In August 2011, Sirota, at the time a member of the Missouri Mavericks of the Central Hockey League, was traded to the Arizona Sundogs for future considerations.  Sirota did not report to the Sundogs, though, instead signing with the Kalamazoo Wings on September 22, 2011.

In the 2013–14 season, Sirota played for Frisk Asker of the Norwegian GET-ligaen. His contract was terminated when he failed to appear for practice after Christmas holidays and the club could not reach him despite repeated attempts, this was considered breach of contract. He later returned to the Kalamazoo Wings on January 7, 2014.

Career statistics

References

External links
 Nick Sirota's Kalamazoo Wings Profile

1984 births
American men's ice hockey right wingers
Idaho Steelheads (ECHL) players
Kalamazoo Wings (ECHL) players
Living people
Missouri Mavericks players
Northern Michigan Wildcats men's ice hockey players
People from Beaver Dam, Wisconsin
Ice hockey players from Wisconsin
Rögle BK players
Spruce Grove Saints players